The 2009 World Series of Poker was the 40th annual World Series of Poker (WSOP). Held in Las Vegas at the Rio All Suite Hotel and Casino, the 2009 series began on May 27 and featured 57 poker championships in several variants. All events but the $10,000 World Championship No Limit Texas hold 'em Main Event, the most prestigious of the WSOP events, ended by July 15. The final table of the Main Event, known as the November Nine, was suspended until November, to allow for better television coverage.  Following the WSOP custom since 1976, each of the event winners received a championship bracelet in addition to that event's prize money, which this year ranged from US$87,778 for the $500 Casino Employees No-Limit Hold'em  to US$8,546,435 for the Main Event.

WSOP game variants
Most of the tournaments played at the WSOP are variants of Texas Hold 'em.  Hold 'em is a community card game where each player may use any combination of the five community cards and the player's own two hole cards to make a poker hand, in contrast to poker variants such as stud or draw in which each player holds a separate individual hand.  Between 2000 and 2009, hold'em surpassed seven-card stud as the most common game in U.S. casinos.  Seven-card stud is a poker variant wherein each player is dealt two hole cards and one face-up to start the hand, followed by three more face-up cards one at a time, and then another hidden card, with betting after each round. Another poker variant played is Omaha, a game in which each player is dealt four hole cards and must use exactly two of them in conjunction with three community cards to make the best possible five-card hand.  Other games played at the 2008 tournament included Razz, HORSE, and Deuce-to-Seven.

Within each of these poker variants a myriad of options exist.  For example, depending on the betting structure, a tournament might be described as no limit, limit or pot-limit. Games may also include other variations on the rules governing the execution of the specific game such as shootout, eight or better, or heads up.

2009 highlights
There were 57 events, two more than in 2008.  The main event had 6,494 buy-ins, 350 fewer than the previous year. Other changes for 2009 include the elimination of rebuy events and the introduction of triple starting chips.

In recognition that 2009 was the 40th WSOP, the tournament started with a special $40,000 No-Limit event.  As one of the most expensive poker tournaments ever, the event attracted what considered to be one of the toughest poker fields ever assembled.  Poker pro, Vitaly Lunkin, won his second bracelet in this event.  Lunkin then finished in second place at the $10,000 pot-limit Omaha event and the $50,000 HORSE Championship, finishing the summer with over $2.7 million.  David Bach, a player with several final table appearances, won his first bracelet in the $50,000 HORSE Championship.  At 18 hours and 44 minutes the final table of the $50K HORSE event was the second longest final table in WSOP history.

Jeff Lisandro became the fifth player to ever win three bracelets in the same year, and the first ever to win bracelets in all three stud variants offered at the WSOP (stud high-only, stud high-low, and Razz) in the same year. Poker superstar Barry Greenstein, said that "A lot of people might have said before this year, we may not ever see another guy win three bracelets because the fields are so big... Lisandro proved them wrong."  He was the first player to do so since Phil Ivey did it in 2002.  By winning two bracelets, Ivey, considered by many to be the best overall poker player in the world, became the youngest player to ever amass seven WSOP bracelets. The milestone means he is tied with Poker Hall of Famer Billy Baxter at sixth place on the most bracelets list.

Due to capacity limitations, the 2009 WSOP turned away over 500 players from the Main Event.  Patrik Antonius, T. J. Cloutier, Layne Flack, Ted Forrest, Brandon Adams, Richard Ashby, and Mickey Appleman were among the notable players turned away from the Main Event.  1996 WSOP champion Huck Seed would have been included in that list, if he had not won the National Heads-Up Poker Championship which meant he was guaranteed entry into the 2009 WSOP Main Event.

Another tournament which met its capacity limits was the "$1,000 buy-in Stimulus Special." This event set a new record for a non-main event tournament with 6,012 participants.

Results
Key

Event 1: $500 Casino Employees No Limit Hold'em
 2-Day Event: Wednesday, May 27 to Thursday, May 28
 Number of buy-ins: 866
 Total prize pool: $389,700
 Number of payouts: 81
 Winning hand: 
 Reference:

Event 2: $40,000 No Limit Hold'em

 4-Day Event: Thursday, May 28 to Sunday, May 31
 Number of buy-ins: 201
 Total prize pool: $7,718,400
 Number of payouts: 27
 Winning hand: 
 Reference:

Event 3: $1,500 Omaha Hi-Low Split-8 or Better

 3-Day Event: Friday, May 29 to Sunday, May 31
 Number of buy-ins: 918
 Total prize pool: $1,253,070
 Number of payouts: 90
 Winning hand: 
 Reference:

Event 4: $1,000 No Limit Hold'em

 5-Day Event: Saturday, May 30 to Wednesday, June 3
 Number of buy-ins: 6,012
 Total prize pool: $
 Number of payouts: 621
 Winning hand: 
 Reference:

Event 5: $1,500 Pot Limit Omaha

 3-Day Event: Monday, June 1 to Wednesday, June 3
 Number of buy-ins: 809
 Total prize pool: $1,042,085
 Number of payouts: 81
 Winning hand: 
 Reference:

Event 6: $10,000 World Championship Seven Card Stud

 3-Day Event: Monday, June 1 to Wednesday, June 3
 Number of buy-ins: 142
 Total prize pool: $1,134,800
 Number of payouts: 16
 Winning hand: 
 Reference:

Event 7: $1,500 No Limit Hold'em

 3-Day Event: Tuesday, June 2 to Thursday, June 4
 Number of buy-ins: 2,791
 Total prize pool: $3,809,715
 Number of payouts: 297
 Winning hand: 
 Reference:

Event 8: $2,500 No Limit 2-7 Draw Lowball

 3-Day Event: Tuesday, June 2 to Thursday, June 4
 Number of buy-ins: 147
 Total prize pool: $
 Number of payouts: 21
 Winning hand: 
 Reference:

Event 9: $1,500 No Limit Hold'em Short Handed

 3-Day Event: Wednesday, June 3 to Friday, June 5
 Number of buy-ins: 1,459
 Total prize pool: $
 Number of payouts: 144
 Winning hand: 
 Reference:

Event 10: $2,500 Pot Limit Hold'em/Omaha

 3-Day Event: Wednesday, June 3 to Friday, June 5
 Number of buy-ins: 453
 Total prize pool: $1,041,900
 Number of payouts: 45
 Winning hand: 
 Reference:

Event 11: $2,000 No Limit Hold'em

 3-Day Event: Thursday, June 4 to Saturday, June 6
 Number of buy-ins: 1,646
 Total prize pool: $2,995,720
 Number of payouts: 171
 Winning hand: 
 Reference:

Event 12: $10,000 World Championship Mixed Event

 3-Day Event: Thursday, June 4 to Saturday, June 6
 Number of buy-ins: 194
 Total prize pool: $1,823,600
 Number of payouts: 24
 Winning hand:  (Omaha-8)
 Reference:

Event 13: $2,500 No Limit Hold'em

 3-Day Event: Friday, June 5 to Sunday, June 7
 Number of buy-ins: 1,088
 Total prize pool: $2,502,400
 Number of payouts: 117
 Winning hand: 
 Reference:

Event 14: $2,500 Limit Hold'em Short Handed

 3-Day Event: Friday, June 5 to Sunday, June 7
 Number of buy-ins: 367
 Total prize pool: $
 Number of payouts: 36
 Winning hand: 
 Reference:

Event 15: $5,000 No Limit Hold'em

 3-Day Event: Saturday, June 6 to Monday, June 8
 Number of buy-ins: 655
 Total prize pool: $3,078,500
 Number of payouts: 63
 Winning hand: 
 Reference:

Event 16: $1,500 Seven Card Stud

 3-Day Event: Saturday, June 6 to Monday, June 8
 Number of buy-ins: 359
 Total prize pool: $
 Number of payouts: 40
 Winning hand: 
 Reference:

Event 17: $1,000 Ladies No Limit Hold'em World Championship

 3-Day Event: Sunday, June 7 to Tuesday, June 9
 Number of buy-ins: 1,060
 Total prize pool: $964,600
 Number of payouts: 117
 Winning hand: 
 Reference:

Event 18: $10,000 World Championship Omaha Hi-Low Split-8 or Better

 3-Day Event: Sunday, June 7 to Tuesday, June 9
 Number of buy-ins: 179
 Total prize pool: $1,682,600
 Number of payouts: 18
 Winning hand: 
 Reference:

Event 19: $2,500 No Limit Hold'em Short Handed

 3-Day Event: Monday, June 8 to Wednesday, June 10
 Number of buy-ins: 1,068
 Total prize pool: $
 Number of payouts: 108
 Winning hand: 
 Reference:

Event 20: $1,500 Pot Limit Hold'em

 3-Day Event: Tuesday, June 9 to Thursday, June 11
 Number of buy-ins: 633
 Total prize pool: $864,045
 Number of payouts: 63
 Winning hand: 
 Reference:

Event 21: $3,000 H.O.R.S.E.

 3-Day Event: Tuesday, June 9 to Thursday, June 11
 Number of buy-ins: 452
 Total prize pool: $1,247,520
 Number of payouts: 48
 Winning hand:  (Hold'em)
 Reference:

Event 22: $1,500 No Limit Hold'em Shootout

 3-Day Event: Wednesday, June 10 to Friday, June 12
 Number of buy-ins: 1,000
 Total prize pool: $1,363,635
 Number of payouts: 100
 Winning hand: 
 Reference:

Event 23: $10,000 World Championship No Limit 2-7 Draw Lowball

 3-Day Event: Wednesday, June 10 to Friday, June 12
 Number of buy-ins: 96
 Total prize pool: $902,400
 Number of payouts: 14
 Winning hand: 7-5-4-3-2
 Reference:

Event 24: $1,500 No Limit Hold'em

 3-Day Event: Thursday, June 11 to Saturday, June 13
 Number of buy-ins: 2,506
 Total prize pool: $3,420,690
 Number of payouts: 270
 Winning hand: 
 Reference:

Event 25: $2,500 Omaha/Seven Card Stud Hi-Low-8 or Better

 3-Day Event: Thursday, June 11 to Saturday, June 13
 Number of buy-ins: 376
 Total prize pool: $864,800
 Number of payouts: 40
 Winning hand: 
 Reference:

Event 26: $1,500 Limit Hold'em

 3-Day Event: Friday, June 12 to Sunday, June 14
 Number of buy-ins: 643
 Total prize pool: $877,695
 Number of payouts: 63
 Winning hand: 
 Reference:

Event 27: $5,000 Pot Limit Omaha Hi-Low Split-8 or Better

 3-Day Event: Friday, June 12 to Sunday, June 14
 Number of buy-ins: 198
 Total prize pool: $930,600
 Number of payouts: 18
 Winning hand: 
 Reference:

Event 28: $1,500 No Limit Hold'em

 3-Day Event: Saturday, June 13 to Monday, June 15
 Number of buy-ins: 2,638
 Total prize pool: $3,600,870
 Number of payouts: 270
 Winning hand: 
 Reference:

Event 29: $10,000 World Championship Heads Up No Limit Hold'em

 4-Day Event: Saturday, June 13 to Tuesday, June 16
 Number of buy-ins: 256
 Total prize pool: $2,406,400
 Number of payouts: 32
 Winning hand: 
 Reference:

Event 30: $2,500 Pot Limit Omaha

 3-Day Event: Sunday, June 14 to Tuesday, June 16
 Number of buy-ins: 436
 Total prize pool: $1,002,800
 Number of payouts: 45
 Winning hand: 
 Reference:

Event 31: $1,500 H.O.R.S.E.

 3-Day Event: Sunday, June 14 to Tuesday, June 16
 Number of buy-ins: 770
 Total prize pool: $1,051,050
 Number of payouts: 72
 Winning hand:  (Stud)
 Reference:

Event 32: $2,000 No Limit Hold'em

 3-Day Event: Monday, June 15 to Wednesday, June 17
 Number of buy-ins: 1,534
 Total prize pool: $2,791,880
 Number of payouts: 171
 Winning hand: 
 Reference:

Event 33: $10,000 World Championship Limit Hold'em

 3-Day Event: Monday, June 15 to Wednesday, June 17
 Number of buy-ins: 185
 Total prize pool: $1,739,000
 Number of payouts: 18
 Winning hand: 
 Reference:

Event 34: $1,500 No Limit Hold'em

 3-Day Event: Tuesday, June 16 to Thursday, June 18
 Number of buy-ins: 2,095
 Total prize pool: $2,859,675
 Number of payouts: 216
 Winning hand: 
 Reference:

Event 35: $5,000 Pot Limit Omaha

 3-Day Event: Wednesday, June 17 to Friday, June 19
 Number of buy-ins: 363
 Total prize pool: $1,706,100
 Number of payouts: 36
 Winning hand: 
 Reference:

Event 36: $2,000 No Limit Hold'em

 3-Day Event: Thursday, June 18 to Saturday, June 20
 Number of buy-ins: 1,695
 Total prize pool: $3,084,900
 Number of payouts: 171
 Winning hand: 
 Reference:

Event 37: $10,000 World Championship Seven Card Stud Hi-Low Split-8 or Better

 3-Day Event: Thursday, June 18 to Saturday, June 20
 Number of buy-ins: 164
 Total prize pool: $1,541,600
 Number of payouts: 16
 Winning hand: 
 Reference:

Event 38: $2,000 Limit Hold'em

 3-Day Event: Friday, June 19 to Sunday, June 21
 Number of buy-ins: 446
 Total prize pool: $811,720
 Number of payouts: 45
 Winning hand: 
 Reference:

Event 39: $1,500 No Limit Hold'em

 3-Day Event: Saturday, June 20 to Monday, June 22
 Number of buy-ins: 2,715
 Total prize pool: $3,705,975
 Number of payouts: 280
 Winning hand: 
 Reference:

Event 40: $10,000 World Championship Pot Limit Omaha

 3-Day Event: Saturday, June 20 to Monday, June 22
 Number of buy-ins: 295
 Total prize pool: $2,773,000
 Number of payouts: 27
 Winning hand: 
 Reference:

Event 41: $5,000 No Limit Hold'em Shootout

 3-Day Event: Sunday, June 21 to Tuesday, June 23
 Number of buy-ins: 280
 Total prize pool: $1,316,000
 Number of payouts: 30
 Winning hand: 
 Reference:

Event 42: $2,500 Mixed Event

 3-Day Event: Sunday, June 21 to Tuesday, June 23
 Number of buy-ins: 412
 Total prize pool: $947,600
 Number of payouts: 40
 Winning hand:  (Hold'em)
 Reference:

Event 43: $1,000 Seniors No Limit Hold'em World Championship

 3-Day Event: Monday, June 22 to Wednesday, June 24
 Number of buy-ins: 2,707
 Total prize pool: $2,463,370
 Number of payouts: 270
 Winning hand: 
 Reference:

Event 44: $2,500 Razz

 3-Day Event: Monday, June 22 to Wednesday, June 24
 Number of buy-ins: 315
 Total prize pool: $724,500
 Number of payouts: 32
 Winning hand: 10-8-4-4-9-7-J
 Reference:

Event 45: $10,000 World Championship Pot Limit Hold'em

 3-Day Event: Tuesday, June 23 to Thursday, June 25
 Number of buy-ins: 275
 Total prize pool: $2,585,000
 Number of payouts: 27
 Winning hand: 
 Reference:

Event 46: $2,500 Omaha Hi-Low Split-8 or Better

 3-Day Event: Tuesday, June 23 to Thursday, June 25
 Number of buy-ins: 424
 Total prize pool: $975,200
 Number of payouts: 45
 Winning hand: 
 Reference:

Event 47: $2,500 Mixed Hold'em

 3-Day Event: Wednesday, June 24 to Friday, June 26
 Number of buy-ins: 527
 Total prize pool: $1,212,100
 Number of payouts: 54
 Winning hand:  No-Limit Hold'em
 Reference:

Event 48: $1,500 Pot Limit Omaha Hi-Low Split-8 or Better

 3-Day Event: Thursday, June 25 to Saturday, June 27
 Number of buy-ins: 762
 Total prize pool: $1,040,130
 Number of payouts: 72
 Winning hand: 
 Reference:

Event 49: $50,000 World Championship H.O.R.S.E.

 5-Day Event: Friday, June 26 to Tuesday, June 30
 Number of buy-ins: 95
 Total prize pool: $4,560,000
 Number of payouts: 16
 Winning hand:  (Razz)
 Reference:

Event 50: $1,500 Limit Hold'em Shootout

 3-Day Event: Friday, June 26 to Sunday, June 28
 Number of buy-ins: 572
 Total prize pool: $779,024
 Number of payouts: 64
 Winning hand: 
 Reference:

Event 51: $1,500 No Limit Hold'em

 3-Day Event: Saturday, June 27 to Monday, June 29
 Number of buy-ins: 2,781
 Total prize pool: $3,796,065
 Number of payouts: 297
 Winning hand: 
 Reference:

Event 52: $3,000 Triple Chance No Limit Hold'em

 3-Day Event: Sunday, June 28 to Tuesday, June 30
 Number of buy-ins: 854
 Total prize pool: $2,357,040
 Number of payouts: 81
 Winning hand: 
 Reference:

Event 53: $1,500 Seven Card Stud Hi-Low-8 or Better

 3-Day Event: Sunday, June 28 to Tuesday, June 30
 Number of buy-ins: 467
 Total prize pool: $637,455
 Number of payouts: 48
 Winning hand: 
 Reference:

Event 54: $1,500 No Limit Hold'em

 3-Day Event: Monday, June 29 to Wednesday, July 1
 Number of buy-ins: 2,818
 Total prize pool: $3,846,570
 Number of payouts: 297
 Winning hand: 
 Reference:

Event 55: $2,500 2-7 Triple Draw Lowball

 3-Day Event: Monday, June 29 to Wednesday, July 1
 Number of buy-ins: 257
 Total prize pool: $593,400
 Number of payouts: 24
 Winning hand: 7-6-5-3-2
 Reference:

Event 56: $5,000 No Limit Hold'em Short Handed

 3-Day Event: Tuesday, June 30 to Thursday, July 2
 Number of buy-ins: 928
 Total prize pool: $4,361,600
 Number of payouts: 90
 Winning hand: 
 Reference:

Event 57: $10,000 World Championship No Limit Hold'em

 13-Day Event: Friday, July 3 to Wednesday, July 15
 Final Table: Saturday, November 7 to Tuesday, November 10
 Number of buy-ins: 6,494
 Total prize pool: $60,043,650
 Number of payouts: 648
 Winning hand: 
 Reference:

References
The $7.7 million prize pool was the largest non-main event prize pool in WSOP history.

The 918 players set a record turnout for an Omaha event at the WSOP.

Event 5 was originally scheduled to end on June 2, but because of the size of the field the tournament was extended a day.

Event 4 had the lowest buy-in of all the open events since the 2006 WSOP.  Dubbed the "$1,000 buy-in Stimulus Special," it set a new record for a non-main event tournament with 6,012 participants.  This number would have been larger, but the tournament was capped at 6,012 players.

Like all the Pot Limit Omaha events, event 52 was a "Triple Chance" event.  In these events players had access to three equal units of chips.  For example, in a $2500 event, players have access to a total of 7500 in chips, but they had to option to start with either 2500, 5000 or all 7500.  If they started with 2500, and lost those chips, they could access another 2500 or their remaining 5000.  They were not eliminated until they had lost all 7500 of their possible starting chips.  Thus the event was not a rebuy event(There were no rebuy events in 2009 WSOP.), but rather one where players could lose all their chips during the first three rounds but not be eliminated until they lost all 7500 chips.  If a player started with less than the full 7500, at the end of three rounds any remaining available 2500 units were added to the player's stacks, and anyone losing all their chips after that point would be eliminated.

The final table of the Main Event is now known as the November Nine as the nine players have to wait until November to determine who the champion is.

References 

World Series of Poker
World Series Of Poker Results, 2009
World Series Of Poker Results, 2009